Taylor Lum (born April 1, 2002), also known by the Chinese name Lin Jiaxin, is a Canadian ice hockey player and member of the Chinese national ice hockey team, currently playing in the Zhenskaya Hockey League (ZhHL) with the KRS Vanke Rays.

Lum represented China in the women's ice hockey tournament at the 2022 Winter Olympics in Beijing.

Career statistics

Regular season and playoffs 

Sources:

International

References

External links
 
 

Living people
2002 births
Sportspeople from Etobicoke
Ice hockey people from Toronto
Canadian women's ice hockey forwards
Shenzhen KRS Vanke Rays players
St. Lawrence Saints women's ice hockey players
Canadian sportspeople of Chinese descent
Olympic ice hockey players of China
Ice hockey players at the 2022 Winter Olympics
Canadian expatriate ice hockey players in China
Canadian expatriate ice hockey players in Russia
Canadian expatriate ice hockey players in the United States